It's Greek to Me-ow! (stylized as IT'S GRΣΣK TΦ MΣ-OW!) is a Tom and Jerry animated short film, released on December 7, 1961. It was the third of the thirteen cartoons in the series to be directed by Gene Deitch and produced by William L. Snyder in Czechoslovakia.

This is one of the few Tom and Jerry shorts to credit the sound effects producer, in this case being Tod Dockstader. The short's name is a pun on the phrase "It's Greek to me".

December 1961 was the year before Walt Disney released the Technicolor Christmas musical film, Babes in Toyland.

Plot
This cartoon opens with a narrator introducing the ancient Greek Acropolis from Ancient Greece, describing its wealth and beautiful architecture ("All the world has seen the beautiful Greek Acropolis from the front"). However, the narrator reveals that on the other end of the Acropolis, people were far lower-class and lived in poor conditions and housing ("But the world never knew what went on behind its back"). Tom is depicted as one of these inhabitants, an alley cat who lives in the shadows of Athens searching for food. He looks into a trash can and sees a reflection of himself yet no food, then spots Jerry coming out from his hole to throw the trash into his own, mouse-sized can. Peeking inside, Tom sees Jerry eating grapes on his bed in his well-furnished home and reaches in to grab him; when he over-stretches his arm around the marble pillars, it snaps back and smacks him right in the face. Next Tom tries to enter the Acropolis and chase Jerry, only to be thrown out because there is a law forbidding cats inside. After failing to hit Jerry with a catapult, he successfully sneaks in but has to keep hiding from the guards, accidentally knocking the arms off the Venus de Milo sculpture in the process (thus giving it its current appearance). Tom then backs away from a knight but Jerry got the head off. Tom then pretends to be a belly dancer, puts the helmet over the knight’s face, and runs off. Tom saw the knight coming but he didn’t watch where he was going and bumped into a statue and the arms fell off. Tom hid behind the statue and pose for it. The knight was gone. Tom saw Jerry going into his hole. Tom caught Jerry with a vase. Tom tried to get Jerry out but Jerry was holding onto the inside of the vase. Tom peered inside but didn’t see Jerry hiding between Tom’s eyes. Tom thought Jerry was still inside but he got his hand stuck. Then Jerry got another vase stuck in Tom’s other hand. Tom then hit a vase like a wrestling ball. Tom saw Jerry, who smashed the vase onto Tom’s head. Tom then tried to pound Jerry but he pounded the Greek pole, which fell on Tom. He tried to break free but Tom got shot out and landed in a trash can and his head got stuck in the ground. But Jerry runs off and Tom, who was still in the trash can and holding a bone and lid, runs after him. Jerry ran into his hole and wore a small suit of armor. Tom laughed himself silly at the fact that Jerry is small but Jerry had a catapult with a rock, which flew in the air and landed on Tom’s tail. Tom broke free but landed on a pole and carved it and fell. Jerry ran into another pole into an elevator and poked a spiked ball into Tom’s head and made a hole. Tom managed to plug it up with a cork. Jerry gets the better of him several more times, tricks him into jumping on a chariot, and unhooks the horses. Jerry returns to his home, runs to the trash can, and takes out the trash again, and the conclusion features Tom careening down the front steps while running and screaming from the Acropolis with the narrator saying that the Greeks had a word for it: "HELP! (ΒΟΗΘΕΙΑ!)".

Cast
Allen Swift as Tom Cat, Jerry Mouse, and the narrator

References

External links

1961 animated films
Films directed by Gene Deitch
Films set in ancient Greece
Films set in Athens
Tom and Jerry short films
1960s American animated films
1961 comedy films
1961 films
1961 short films
Metro-Goldwyn-Mayer short films
Metro-Goldwyn-Mayer animated short films
Rembrandt Films short films
Animated films without speech
1960s English-language films